Lui Lai Yiu (born 30 November 1994) is an athlete from Hong Kong specialising in the sprint hurdles. She won a bronze medal at the 2018 Asian Games. She also won a gold medal at the 2017 Asian Indoor and Martial Arts Games.

Her personal bests are 13.32 seconds in the 100 metres hurdles (+1.3 m/s, Doha 2019) and 8.41 seconds in the 60 metres hurdles (Ashgabat 2017).

International competitions

References

1994 births
Living people
Hong Kong female hurdlers
Athletes (track and field) at the 2014 Asian Games
Athletes (track and field) at the 2018 Asian Games
Asian Games bronze medalists for Hong Kong
Medalists at the 2018 Asian Games
Asian Games medalists in athletics (track and field)
Competitors at the 2015 Summer Universiade
Competitors at the 2017 Summer Universiade
Competitors at the 2019 Summer Universiade
21st-century Hong Kong women